Parbhani district (Marathi pronunciation: [pəɾbʰəɳiː]) is one of the eight districts in the Marathawada region of Maharashtra state of India. Parbhani city is the headquarters of this district. Parbhani district is well known for religious tourism of Jainism, Hinduism.

Officer

Members of Parliament

Sanjay Haribhau Jadhav(SHS(UBT))

Guardian Minister

list of Guardian Minister

District Magistrate/Collector

list of District Magistrate / Collector

History
From 1596 to 1724, major part of the present territory of the district was divided between Pathri and Washim sarkars of Berar Subah of the Mughal empire. In 1724, after the battle of Sakharkheda, it went under the Nizam's rule. Following the re-organization of the states in 1956, Parbhani along with the other districts of Marathwada became part of Bombay State. On 1 May 1960 when Maharashtra state was formed, it became a part of it.

During Namantar Andolan Parbhani district and its villages faced cultural animosities which brought civil rights revolution in Marathwada region.

Geography 
Parbhani district lies between 18.45 and 20.10 North Latitudes and 76.13 and 77.39 East Longitude. The district is bounded on the north by Hingoli and Buldhana districts. On the east by Nanded and Hingoli, on the South by Latur and on the West by Beed and Jalna districts.

The hills on the north east form part of the Ajanta Hill ranges which passes through Jintur Tahsil. The hills on the southern side are the Balaghat Hill ranges. The district is at an average height of 357 m from mean sea level.

Climate
Parbhani's climate is classified as tropical. The Köppen-Geiger climate classification is Aw. When compared with winter, the summers have much more rainfall.

This entire Marathwada region, a district geographical region, was a part of Hyderabad State. After reorganization of states in 1956 it became a part of the then Bombay state and from 1960 onwards it is part of the present Maharashtra state.

The state capital of Mumbai is to the west; Parbhani is well connected by road to other major towns in Maharashtra and also in the neighboring state of Telangana. Parbhani is a major railway junction connecting Telangana with Marathwada.

In the northeast, on the boundary of Parbhani and Hingoli districts there is extension of Ajanta ranges called Nirmal Hills. The main river in the district is Godavari river, other rivers are Purna and Dudhana which are tributaries of Godavari. Major dams in Parbhani district are Yeldari dam which is on Purna river, Lower Dudhana dam is on Dudhana river, Mudgal barrage on Godavari river, Masoli Dam on Masoli river, and Karpara Dam on Karpara river.

Administrative Divisions 
Parbhani district covers an area of about 6250.58 km2.  The district is divided into 9 administrative Sub-units (Tehsils), namely, Parbhani, Gangakhed, Sonpeth, Pathri, Manwath, Palam, Selu, Jintur, and Purna.

Demographics

According to the 2011 census Parbhani district has a population of 1,836,086, roughly equal to the nation of Kosovo or the US state of Nebraska. This gives it a ranking of 259th in India (out of a total of 640). Its population growth rate over the decade 2001-2011 was  20.18%. Parbhani has a sex ratio of 940 females for every 1000 males, and a literacy rate of 75.22%. 31.03% of the population lived in urban areas. Scheduled Castes and Scheduled Tribes made up 13.47% and 2.21% of the population respectively.

Ministry of Minority Affairs declared Parbhani as Minority Concentration District as Muslims makes 15.97% of the population.

Languages

At the time of the 2011 Census of India, 78.35% of the population in the district spoke Marathi, 11.97% Urdu, 4.99% Hindi and 3.06% Lambadi as their first language.

Languages used mostly in the district include Marathi, Dakkhani (Deccan) Urdu, Andh, Lambadi and Hindi.

Land of saints 
Parbhani has been described as the land of saints, as several saints have been associated with Parbhani including Janabai from Gangakhed. The famous mathematician Bhaskarbhatt was from Bori in Parbhani district.

Turabul Haq Dargah, the tomb of the eponymous Muslim saint is located in Parbhani city.

Nemgiri (sequence of caves) related to Jainism, is situated in Jintur town of the district.

Sri Sai Janmasthan Temple (Sai Baba Birth Temple) is a temple in heart of the Pathri town, where spiritual master Sai Baba of Shirdi was born.

Selu town was home to Guru of Shri Sai Baba "Shri Babasaheb Maharaj". Sai Baba stayed with him for 12 years during which time he acquired knowledge from his Guru.

Mudgaleshwar 
It is located on the bank of the Godavari river. A temple is in the midst of the river. The temple in the middle of the river flow and is more than nine hundred years old and same is written on stone script at the entrance. Temple on river bank and old ghat was built by "Ahilya Bai" 250 years back.  Lord "Narasimha Swamy" has taken the form "Shivalinga" along with his wife "Mahalaxmi" and son "Moudgalya" and daughter-in-law "Jaabalabai". During rainy season the temple gets immersed in water. To have darshan one has to swim to the temple.  Best time to visit is summer season i.e. from April to June. To reach the place one has to travel by train via "Parbhani" or "Parli Vaidyanath".

The temple used to be managed by Shri Sahebrao Mudgalkar and Shri Subhashrao Mudgalkar. The Shivaratri is celebrated here every year.  All type of pujas are performed here. Nagbali and Sukhshanti pujas are very famous.

The new dam is constructed on the river. Recently a Dattatriya temple is constructed and murthy staphana is completed on 26 December 2012.

See also
Make in Maharashtra
Turabul Haq Dargah, Parbhani
Marathwada

References

External links

 Parbhani district website
 Selu (Sailu) Taluka Website

 
Districts of Maharashtra
Minority Concentrated Districts in India
Marathwada
Aurangabad division